John Little  (born 1928) is a Canadian artist, known as the chronicler of the urban heritage of his home city of Montreal in oils.

Career
Little was born in Montreal. After studying at the Montreal Museum of Fine Arts and with the Art Students League of New York (where he met Ray Bailley and helped to illustrate the Bruce Gentry comic strip), Little joined Luke & Little, his family's architectural practice in 1951, working as a draftsman. After his marriage in 1953 he made painting his primary profession, and showed his work at the Watson Art Gallery. Besides painting, he illustrated covers for Maclean's Magazine.

Little joined the Royal Canadian Academy as an associate member in 1961 and became a full member in 1973. 
His work is held in many public collections such as the National Gallery of Canada, the Beaverbrook Art Gallery, the Leonard & Bina Ellen Art Gallery at Concordia University, and the Montreal Museum of Contemporary Art.

References

1928 births
Living people
20th-century Canadian painters
Canadian male painters
21st-century Canadian painters
Members of the Royal Canadian Academy of Arts
20th-century Canadian male artists
21st-century Canadian male artists
Art Students League of New York alumni